Weston Wharf is a railway station on the Cambrian Heritage Railways' line in Shropshire on the former Oswestry and Newtown Railway. It is located just off Weston Road near the Shropshire village of Morda and serves the Weston Pools area of Oswestry,  to the north.

History
Work on the extension from Oswestry had begun in 2016 and had proceeded in three stages: phase one from Oswestry to Gasworks Bridge which carries the B4579 Shrewsbury Road over the line, phase two to make Gasworks Bridge passable and phase three to reach Weston Wharf. At Gasworks Bridge, the track had to be lowered to allow trains to pass under the steel girder frame installed to strengthen the bridge.

The station was officially opened on 2 April 2022 by Helen Morgan MP and Vince Hunt, Chairman of Shropshire Council. It consists of a single platform, a run-around loop and a siding. Previously, there was no station here, only a goods depot.

References

External links
http://www.cambrianrailways.com/html/preservation.html
http://www.cambrianrailways.com/html/map_of_chr_lines.html
https://www.therailwayhub.co.uk/7457/oswestry-group-clears-the-way-for-weston-wharf-extension/
https://www.shropshirestar.com/news/2016/01/03/shropshire-heritage-railway-to-start-on-extension/

Heritage railway stations in Shropshire
Railway stations in Great Britain opened in 2022
Railway stations built for UK heritage railways